Manfred Römbell (3 December 1941, Bildstock – 22 June 2010, Saarbrücken) was a German author.

Awards 
 1969 Kurt-Magnus-Preis established by the ARD
 1975 Reisestipendium des Auswärtigen Amtes
 1986 Kunstpreis der Stadt Saarbrücken
 2002 Otto-Weil-Kulturpreis der Stadt Friedrichsthal
 2004 Stipendium des Künstlerhauses Schloss Wiepersdorf

Works 
 1971: Kaltluft, Pforzheim
 Kurze Prozesse. 17 Texte. Wolfgang Fietkau Verlag, Berlin 1973 (Schritte 23), .
 1976: Richtig lebendig wird es auf dem Friedhof im Herbst, München
 1977: Brennen mit Licht, Köln
 1980: Das nächste Fest soll noch größer werden, Dillingen
 1981: Stadt und Land, Dillingen (zusammen mit Jürgen Proföhr und Udo Wolter)
 1982: Durchsichtig ist das Land, Rastatt
 1984: Vogesenflut, Saarbrücken
 1989: Rotstraßenzeit, Landau/Pfalz
 1993: Rotstraßenträume, Landau/Pfalz
 1995: Grenzüberschreitung, Saarbrücken
 1996: Rotstraßenende, Blieskastel
 2001: FernsehSpott, Frankfurt am Main
 2007: Was blieb von all den Blicken, Blieskastel
 2009: Doppelleben. Gollenstein-Verl., Merzig 2009, 357 pages, .

References

External links 
 https://web.archive.org/web/20100626053844/http://www.manfredroembell.de/
 http://www.sulb.uni-saarland.de/de/literatur/saarland/autoren/R/roembel_manfred

1941 births
2010 deaths
People from Friedrichsthal
German male writers